Sean D. Naylor is an American journalist. Naylor is the National Security Correspondent for Yahoo News. He previously covered intelligence and counterterrorism for Foreign Policy and spent over 20 years at Army Times, with stints as an embedded reporter with troops in Somalia, Haiti, the Balkans, Afghanistan and Iraq. Naylor has freelanced for The New York Times and Newsweek and is the author of two books, Not a Good Day to Die: The Untold Story of Operation Anaconda and Relentless Strike: The Secret History of Joint Special Operations Command.

Early life
Born in 1966  in Calgary, Alberta, Canada to British parents, a geologist and a journalist, Naylor earned a master's degree in international relations in 1990 from Boston University. From the age of 18 months until the eve of his ninth birthday, he lived in Surrey, England. He then moved to Dublin, Ireland, and became a music journalist at age 16.

Writing career
After graduating from Boston University, where he studied journalism on a scholarship, he joined Army Times. Naylor's beats included U.S. Army training, readiness and the service's senior leadership. He has covered the military in Pakistan, Somalia and Haiti.

In 1995, Naylor co-wrote his first book, Clash of Chariots: The Great Tank Battles. In January 2002, the 101st Airborne Division (Air Assault) took a couple dozen journalists, including Naylor, into Afghanistan with Task Force Rakkasan. Naylor spent almost four months covering the War in Afghanistan, including several days in the Shah-i-Kot Valley at the start of Operation Anaconda. He returned to the valley at the end of the operation with 10th Mountain Division troops. He was one of eight journalists allowed to accompany the troops into battle during Operation Anaconda, and spent the following three years interviewing almost 200 participants and accessed secret documents that explained the full role of the Advanced Force Operations in Operation Anaconda. With this information, Naylor wrote his second book, Not a Good Day to Die: The Untold Story of Operation Anaconda, published in 2005. In 2015, his book Relentless Strike: The Secret History of Joint Special Operations Command was published by St. Martin's Press.

Bibliography
 Donnelly, Thomas, Sean Naylor, and Walter J. Boyne. Clash of Chariots: The Great Tank Battles. New York: Berkley Books, 1996. . .
 Naylor, Sean. Not a Good Day to Die: The Untold Story of Operation Anaconda. New York: Berkley Books, 2005. . .

References

External links
 Naylor discusses Not a Good Day to Die at the Pritzker Military Museum & Library
 Naylor moderates a panel discussion with Six Colby Award Winners at the Pritzker Military Museum & Library
 Naylor participates in a panel discussion, Facing the Future:Writing on War in the 21st Century at the Pritzker Military Museum & Library
 
 "Not a Good Day to Die" and Operation Anaconda information

Year of birth missing (living people)
Living people
Boston University College of Arts and Sciences alumni
Canadian people of British descent
Journalists from Alberta
People from Calgary
Canadian war correspondents
War correspondents of the War in Afghanistan (2001–2021)